A customs union is generally defined as a type of trade bloc which is composed of a free trade area with a common external tariff.

Customs unions are established through trade pacts where the participant countries set up common external trade policy (in some cases they use different import quotas). Common competition policy is also helpful to avoid competition deficiency.

Purposes for establishing a customs union normally include increasing economic efficiency and establishing closer political and cultural ties between the member countries. It is the third stage of economic integration.

Every economic union, customs and monetary union and economic and monetary union includes a customs union.

WTO definition 
The General Agreement on Tariffs and Trade, part of the World Trade Organization framework defines a customs union in the following way:

Historical background 
The German Customs Union, the Zollverein, which was established in 1834, and gradually developed and expanded, was a customs union organization that appeared earlier and played a role in promoting German economic development and political unification at that time. Before the establishment of the unified German Empire in the 1870s, there were checkpoints between and within the German states, which hindered the development of industry and commerce. In 1818, Prussia took the lead in abolishing the customs duties in the mainland; it was followed by the establishment of the North German Customs Union in 1826. Two years later, two customs unions were established in the states of South Germany.

In 1834, 18 states joined together to form the German Customs Union with Prussia as the main leader. Thereafter, this alliance was further expanded to all German-speaking regions and became the All-German Customs Union. The contents of the alliance convention included: abolishing internal tariffs, unifying external tariffs, raising import tax rates, and allocating tariff income to all states in the alliance in proportion. In addition, there is a customs union between France and Monaco, which was established in 1865.

A customs union was established by Switzerland and Liechtenstein in 1924, by Belgium, the Netherlands, and Luxembourg in 1948, by the countries of the European Economic Community in 1958, and by the Economic Community of Central African States in 1964. At that time, the European Free Trade Association was different from the European Economic Community Customs Union. Free trade within the former was limited to industrial products, and no uniform tariffs were imposed on countries outside the Union.

It was brought into action by the initiative of Prussia and joined by most of the German states. Pre- modern conditions ( 30+ currencies, trade barriers etc.) were viewed as an obstacle as obstacles to o economic exchange and growth by the new commercial classes, who argued for the creation of a unified economic territory allowing the unhindered movement of goods, people and capital.

Main feature 
The main feature of the Customs Union is that the member countries have not only eliminated trade barriers and implemented free trade, but also established a common external tariff. In other words, in addition to agreeing to eliminate each other 's trade barriers, members of the Customs Union also adopt common external tariff and trade policies. GATT stipulates that if the customs union is not established immediately, but is gradually completed over a period of time, it should be completed within a reasonable period, which generally does not exceed 10 years.

Protect measures 
The exclusive protection measures of the Customs Union mainly include the following:

 Reduce tariffs until the tariffs within the union are cancelled. In order to achieve this goal, the alliance often stipulates that the member countries must transition from their current external tariff rates to the unified tariff rates stipulated by the alliance in stages within a certain period of time, until finally canceling tariff.
 Formulate a unified foreign trade policy and foreign tariff rates. In terms of foreign affairs, allied members must increase or decrease their original foreign tariff rates within the prescribed time, and eventually establish a common external tariff rate; and gradually unify their foreign trade policies, such as foreign discrimination policies and import quantities. 
 For goods imported from outside the alliance, common different tariffs are levied, such as preferential tax rates, agreed national tax rates, most-favored nation tax rates, ordinary preferential tax rates, and ordinary tax rates, according to the types of commodities and the provider countries.
 Formulate unified protective measures, such as import quotas, health and epidemic prevention standards, etc.

Meaning 
 It avoids the problem that the free trade zone needs to be supplemented by the principle of origin to maintain the normal flow of commodities. Here, instead of the principle of origin, a common 'foreign barrier' is built. In this sense, the customs union is more exclusive than the free trade zone.
 It makes the 'national sovereignty' of the member countries to be transferred to the economic integration organization to a greater extent, so that once a country joins a customs union, it loses its right to autonomous tariffs. In reality, the more typical customs union is the European Economic Community established in 1958.

Economic effects 
Economic effects of customs unions can generally be grouped into static effects and dynamic effects.

Static effects 
There are trade creation effects and trade diversion effects. The trade creation effect refers to the benefits generated by products from domestic production with higher production costs to the production of customs union countries with lower costs. The trade diversion effect refers to the loss incurred when a product is imported from a non-member country with lower production costs to a member country with a higher cost. This is the price of joining the customs union. When the trade creation effect is greater than the transfer effect, the combined effect of joining the Customs Union on the member countries is net profit, which means an increase in the economic welfare level of the member countries; otherwise, it is a net loss and a decline in the economic welfare level.

The trade creation effect is usually regarded as a positive effect. This is because the domestic production cost of country A is higher than the production cost of country A 's imports from country B. The Customs Union made Country A give up the domestic production of some commodities and change it to Country B to produce these commodities. From a worldwide perspective, this kind of production conversion improves the efficiency of resource allocation.

Dynamic effects 
The customs union will not only bring static effects to member states, but also bring some dynamic effects to them. Sometimes, this dynamic effect is more important than its static effect, which has an important impact on the economic growth of member countries.

 The first dynamic effect of the customs union is the large market effect (or economies of scale effect). After the establishment of the customs union, good conditions have been created for the mutual export of products between member countries. This expansion of the market has promoted the development of enterprise production, allowing producers to continuously expand production scale, reduce costs, enjoy the benefits of economies of scale, and can further enhance the externality of enterprises within the alliance, especially for non-member companies competitive power. Therefore, the large market effect created by the Customs Union has triggered the realization of economies of scale.
 The establishment of the Customs Union has promoted competition among enterprises among member countries. Before the member states formed a customs union, many sectors had formed domestic monopolies, and several enterprises had occupied the domestic market for a long time and obtained excessive monopoly profits. Therefore, it is not conducive to the resource allocation and technological progress of various countries. After the formation of the customs union, due to the mutual openness of the markets of various countries, enterprises of various countries face competition from similar enterprises in other member countries. As a result, in order to gain a favorable position in the competition, enterprises will inevitably increase research and development investment and continuously reduce production costs, thereby creating a strong competitive atmosphere within the alliance, improving economic efficiency, and promoting technological progress.
 The establishment of a customs union helps to attract external investment. The establishment of a customs union implies the exclusion of products from non-members. In order to counteract such adverse effects, countries outside the alliance may transfer enterprises to some countries within the customs union to directly produce and sell locally in order to bypass uniform tariff and non-tariff barriers. This objectively generates capital inflows that accompany the transfer of production, attracting large amounts of foreign direct investment.

Lists of customs unions

Current 

Additionally, the autonomous and dependent territories such as some of the EU member state special territories are sometimes treated as separate customs territories from their mainland states or have varying arrangements of formal or de facto customs union, common market and currency union (or combinations thereof) with the mainland and in regards to third countries through the trade pacts signed by the mainland state.

The European Union is a customs union and therefore sets a common external tariff.

Proposed 
2010  Southern African Development Community (SADC)
2011 Economic Community of Central African States (ECCAS)
2015  Arab Customs Union (ACU)
2023  African Economic Community (AEC)

Defunct 
Customs and Economic Union of Central Africa (UDEAC) – superseded by CEMAC
  1925 French Customs Union over occupied Territory of the Saar Basin
The former Zollverein of the Holy Roman Empire and the succeeding German confederations
   Steuerverein or Tax Union in north-west Germany
  Custom Union Between Lebanon and Syria
Czechia and Slovakia from the dissolution of Czechoslovakia on 1 January 1993 until both countries' accession to the European Union on 1 May 2004.

Further reading 
 The McGill University Faculty of Law runs a Regional Trade Agreements Database that contains the text of almost all preferential and regional trade agreements in the world. ptas.mcgill.ca
 Michael T. Florinsky. 1934. The Saar Struggle. New York: The Macmillan Company.

See also 
 European Customs Information Portal (ECIP)
 List of international trade topics
 Trade creation
 Trade diversion

References

External links 
 Agreements Notified to the GATT/WTO and in Force

 
Commercial policy
Economic integration
Trade blocs